Events from the year 1619 in Ireland.

Incumbent 
Monarch: James I

Events 
March – construction of the walls of Derry by The Honourable The Irish Society is completed, at a cost of £10,757.
28 March – Captain Nicholas Pynnar completes his Survey of the Escheated Counties of Ulster.
1 May – native Irish ordered to leave lands of the British Plantation of Ulster by this date or be fined.
3 October – Lancelot Bulkeley is consecrated Archbishop of Dublin (Church of Ireland), an office he will hold until 1650.
Stewart Castle, Newtownstewart, County Tyrone, is built by Sir Robert Newcomen.
Dermod O'Meara's text on genetic disorders, De Moribus: Pathologia Haereditaria Generalis is published in Dublin, the first work in Latin and the first medical text published in Ireland.

Births 
 Dudley Loftus, jurist and orientalist (d. 1695)

Deaths 
10 April – Thomas Jones, Protestant churchman (b. c.1550).
Christopher St Lawrence, 10th Baron Howth, statesman (b. c.1568)

References

 
1610s in Ireland
Ireland
Years of the 17th century in Ireland